In rail transport, an open-access operator is an operator that takes full commercial risk, running on infrastructure owned by a third party and buying paths on a chosen route and in countries where rail services run under franchises are not subject to franchising.

By country

Austria 
 RegioJet
 WESTbahn

Czech Republic 
 LEO Express
 RegioJet

Belgium 

 Eurostar

France 
 Eurostar
 Trenitalia France
 Izy

Germany 
 FlixTrain
 Harz-Berlin-Express
 Nightjet
 WESTbahn

Former operators
 Hamburg-Köln-Express taken over by Flixtrain
 Locomore Stuttgart-Berlin route taken over by Leo Express

Hungary 
 RegioJet

Italy 
 DB/ÖBB Italia
 Nightjet
 NTV (Italo)

Former operators
 Arenaways

Netherlands 
 GreenCityTrip (weekly from Amsterdam / Utrecht to Prague via Dresden)
 TUI SKI Express (operated by GreenCityTrip during winter months. Weekly train from Amsterdam/Utrecht to various destinations in the Austrian alps)
 Arriva night services

Portugal
 Takargo Rail
 COMSA Rail Transport

Slovakia 
 RegioJet (all services except those on Bratislava — Komárno mainline, which are franchised)

Slovenia 
 Adria transport

Spain 
 Ouigo España
 Iryo

Sweden 
FlixTrain
 MTRX
 Snälltåget (Transdev) (Malmö–Stockholm–Åre)
 TÅGAB

Former operators
 Blå Tåget
 Saga Rail

United Kingdom
Eurostar
Grand Central
Heathrow Express 
Hull Trains
Lumo

In development
 Alliance Rail Holdings
 Go! Co-operative
 Grand Union

Former operators
Heathrow Connect (absorbed by TfL Rail May 2018)
Wrexham & Shropshire (ceased trading January 2011)

Former proposals
 First Harrogate Trains
 Glasgow Trains
 On Route Logistics (company dissolved)
 Platinum Trains
 Rutland Rail (company dissolved)

References

Rail transport operators